John Van Riemsdijk (13 November 1924 – 31 August 2008) was a curator of the Science Museum, London. He was instrumental in establishing the National Railway Museum in the years before 1975. He was a noted model engineer and author. He merited a Guardian newspaper obituary in 2008.

Biography
Van Riemsdijk was born in 1924. His parentage brought a Dutch father and an English mother together. So that as a young man, he travelled widely by train with his father around Europe. He attended University College School, Hampstead, and Birkbeck College, London, where he read English and French. Soon after graduating he was recruited into the Royal Navy.

Combining his knowledge of continental Europe and his practical inventive skills saw him recruited in World War Two into the Special Operations Executive.

Prior to joining the Science Museum in 1954, he had already made a name for himself in the model railway world with a geared clockwork mechanism. This was marketed as the Walker Riemsdijk mechanism. The Walker element referring to the London shop of Walkers & Holtzapffel in whose catalogue it was featured.

During the design of the National Railway Museum he worked closely with David Jenkinson.

He became an acknowledged expert in the history and practice of the Compound locomotive.

Memberships

He held memberships of the Newcomen Society, Stephenson Locomotive Society, the Bevil's Club, and the office of a vice-president of the Gauge One Model Railway Association.

Further reading
Publications authored by John Van Riemsdijk:
 
Modelling in Gauge 1 Book 2: John van Riemsdijk's Contribution, Gauge One Model Railway Association, West Sussex, 2005.
The engineer as hero (George Stephenson Bicentenary Lecture) in the Proc. Instn Mech. Engrs., 1981.
The Science Museum (also edited by Pippa Richardson), Science Museum, London, 1981. .

Material about John Van Riemsdijk:
Close encounter of a Gauge '1' kind a feature by David Jenkinson in Modeller's Backtrack magazine Vol.1 No.4 for October November 1991.
His biography in the Steam Index.

References

1924 births
2008 deaths
British curators